Sigla himinfley is an Icelandic drama miniseries created by Þráinn Bertelsson. The series takes place in Vestmannaeyjar, Iceland, and follows the lives of an influential family in the fishing industry.

References

External links
 

Icelandic drama television series
1996 Icelandic television series debuts
1996 Icelandic television series endings
1990s Icelandic television series
1990s drama television series
RÚV original programming